The 1954 Kentucky Derby was the 80th running of the Kentucky Derby. The race took place on May 1, 1954.

Full results

References

1954
Kentucky Derby
Derby
Kentucky
Kentucky Derby